Chryseobacterium angstadtii  is a Gram-negative, rod-shaped and non-motile bacteria from the genus of Chryseobacterium which has been isolated from a glass tank which contained several eastern newts (Notophthalmus viridescens).

References

Further reading

External links
Type strain of Chryseobacterium angstadtii at BacDive -  the Bacterial Diversity Metadatabase

angstadtii
Bacteria described in 2013